The 1998 Wigan Warriors season was the 103rd season in the club's rugby league history and the third season in the Super League. Coached by John Monie, the Warriors competed in Super League III and finished in 1st place, and went on to win the  Grand Final at Old Trafford against Leeds Rhinos. The club also competed in the 1998 Challenge Cup, and finished as runners-up following a surprise defeat in the final against Sheffield Eagles.

Table

Squad

Transfers

In

Out

References

External links
Wigan Warriors Rugby League Fan Site
Wigan - Rugby League Project

Wigan Warriors seasons
Wigan Warriors